"Suki da Nante Ienai" ("I Can't Say I Love You") is Fayray's 14th single and last on avex trax. It was released on January 29, 2003, and peaked on the Oricon chart at #19.  The song was used as the theme song for the 
Yomiuri TV/Nippon TV series drama "Message Kotoba ga, Uragitte Iku".  The coupling is a cover of Janis Ian's "Love Is Blind".

Track listing

Love is Blind
(instrumental)

Charts 
"Suki da Nante Ienai" - Oricon Sales Chart (Japan)

References

External links
FAYRAY OFFICIAL SITE

2003 singles
Fayray songs
Japanese television drama theme songs
2003 songs
Songs written by Fayray
Avex Trax singles